Qizil may refer to:
 Kizil Caves, in Baicheng County (Bay), Aksu Prefecture, Xinjiang, China
 Qizil, Iran, a village in Kermanshah Province, Iran